Warner Music Sweden AB (previously Metronome Records) is a Swedish record company and label, a subsidiary of Warner Music Group. Metronome Records was established in 1949 by Anders Burman, Lars Burman, and Börje Ekberg and was based in Stockholm.

It concentrated on pop and jazz and had operations in Sweden, Denmark, and Germany. The label signed Alice Babs, Bent Fabric, Sonya Hedenbratt, Nina & Frederik, Ola Magnell, Charlie Norman, Pugh Rogefeldt, Kalle Sändare, Bernt Staf, Owe Thörnqvist, and Cornelis Vreeswijk

During 1949–65, Metronome's jazz catalogue also included Arne Domnérus, Rolf Ericson, Lars Gullin, Bengt Hallberg, Zoot Sims, and Toots Thielemans.

In 1979, it was purchased by Warner Music Group. In 1998, Anderson Records was merged with Warner Music Sweden.

In February 2013, Warner Music Group acquired most european EMIcatalogue including the Swedish Back catalogue of EMI (renamed as "Parlophone Music Sweden") from Universal Music Group EMI Trademark still own by UMG.

In June 2016, Warner Music acquired the Swedish compilation label X5 Music Group.

Artists
The list contains artists signed directly to Warner Music Sweden.

 3OH!3
 AJR
 Ace Wilder
 Adam Kanyama
 Alina Devecerski
 Alter Bridge
 Arash
 Avenged Sevenfold
 Avicii
 B.o.B
 Basshunter
 Biffy Clyro
 Birdy
 Björn Skifs
 Bruno Mars
 CeeLo Green
 Charli XCX
 Cher
 Christer Sjögren
 Christina Perri
 Christopher
 Clean Bandit
 Coldplay
 Damon Albarn
 Die Ärzte
 Donkeyboy
 Ebbot Lundberg
 Echosmith
 Edda Magnason
 Eldkvarn
 Eric Amarillo
 Fancy
 Foals
 Fritjof & Pikanen
 fun.
 Gesaffelstein
 Goo Goo Dolls
 Green Day
 Gyllene Tider
 Gym Class Heroes
 Halestorm
 Iron Maiden
 Jonny Jakobsen
 James Blunt
 Jason Mraz
 Josef Johansson
 Josh Groban
 Joshua Radin
 Justice
 Kleerup
 Kylie Minogue
 Laleh
 Lani Mo
 Lil Peep
 Lily Allen
 Linkin Park
 Little Jinder
 Louise Hoffsten
 Lupe Fiasco
 Lykke Li
 Magnus Uggla
 Marie Fredriksson
 Mauro Scocco
 Michael Bublé
 Mikael Wiehe
 Missy Elliott
 Muse
 NoNoNo
 Neil Young
 Nic & the Family
 Nickelback
 Nico & Vinz
 Opeth
 Oscar Zia
 PH3
 Paolo Nutini
 Paramore
 Prince
 Pugh Rogefeldt
 Red Hot Chili Peppers
 Rhymes & Riddim
 Rudimental
 Röyksopp
 Sanna Nielsen
 Seal
 Skrillex
 Slash
 Stallet
 Stone Sour
 Stone Temple Pilots
 T.I.
 The Black Keys
 The Sounds
 Thundermother
 Timbuktu
 Tinie Tempah
 Tommy Körberg
 TooManyLeftHands
 Tove Lo
 Travie McCoy
 Trey Songz
 Ulf Lundell
 Vance Joy
 Viktor & The Blood
 Waka Flocka Flame
 Winhill/Losehill
 Wiz Khalifa

See also
List of Warner Music Group labels

References

Bibliography
Håkan Lahger, Lasse Ermalm: De legendariska åren: Metronome Records (Premium Publishing)

External links
 

 
Swedish record labels
Record labels established in 1949